The 2018 Mount Union Purple Raiders football team will represent the University of Mount Union in the 2018 NCAA Division III football season. The Purple Raiders, will be led by sixth-year head coach Vince Kehres, are members of the Ohio Athletic Conference (OAC) and will play their home games at Mount Union Stadium in Alliance, Ohio.

Schedule
Mount Union's 2018 schedule consists of 5 home, and 5 away games in the regular season. The Raiders will host  Rose-Hulman, John Caroll, Wilmington College, Heidelberg University, and Marietta College and will travel to Baldwin Wallace, Otterbein University, Capital University, Ohio Northern, and Muskingum University.

Mount Union will have one non–conference game against the Rose-Hulman Institute of Technology from the Heartland Collegiate Athletic Conference.

In 2017, Mount Union won the Stagg Bowl after winning against the University of Mary Hardin–Baylor 12–0. The team finished with a 15–0 record, with a 9–0 record in conference play. The Purple Raiders failed to win the championship again after winning it last year, by losing 16–24 in a rematch with Mary Hardin-Baylor in the Stagg Bowl.

References

Mount Union
Mount Union Purple Raiders football seasons
Mount Union Purple Raiders football